Jüri Saska (born 20 August 1974 in Adavere) is an Estonian naval officer. He has served as Commander of the Estonian Navy .

References 

Living people
Year of birth missing (living people)
Place of birth missing (living people)
Estonian admirals